Efraim Taburi (born Efraim Popik on 5 September 1900, died 7 April 1957) was a Zionist activist and politician.

Biography
Born in Tulchyn in the Russian Empire (today in Ukraine), Taburi was a member of Socialist Zionist movements. He was arrested by the Soviet authorities, and in 1924 made aliyah to Mandatory Palestine, where he worked for Tel Aviv city council. In 1927, he became secretary of the Tel Aviv branch of Ahdut HaAvoda, and in 1929 became a member of the Tel Aviv Workers Council. He also served as a member of the Assembly of Representatives.

In 1949, he was elected to the first Knesset on the Mapai list. He was re-elected in 1951, but lost his seat in the 1955 elections. He died in 1957 at the age of 56.

External links

1900 births
1957 deaths
People from Tulchyn
People from Bratslavsky Uyezd
Ukrainian Jews
Soviet emigrants to Mandatory Palestine
20th-century Israeli Jews
Jews in Mandatory Palestine
Ahdut HaAvoda politicians
Mapai politicians
Members of the Assembly of Representatives (Mandatory Palestine)
Members of the 1st Knesset (1949–1951)
Members of the 2nd Knesset (1951–1955)